Láá Láá Bwamu, also known as asKàdenbà is a Gur language of Burkina Faso.

References

Bwa languages (Gur)
Languages of Burkina Faso